Bulgarian folk dances are intimately related to the music of Bulgaria. This distinctive feature of Balkan folk music is the asymmetrical meter, built up around various combinations of 'quick' and 'slow' beats. The music, in Western musical notation, is often described using compound meter notation, where the notational meter accents, i.e., the heard beats, can be of different lengths, usually 1, 2, 3, or 4.  Many Bulgarian dances are line dances, in which the dancers dance in a straight or curved line, holding hands.

Overview
Many Bulgarian dances are line dances, with the dancers holding hands in a straight or curved line, facing in toward the center of the dance space. Originally men and women danced in separate lines, or in a gender-segregated line in which the last woman and first man held opposite ends of a handkerchief, to avoid gender contact but today men and women often dance in mixed lines. Several different handholds are used in the different dances"
 Holding hands down at waist level, the arms of adjacent dancers in the shape of a "V", right hand facing forward, left hand facing back
 Holding hands at shoulder level, with the arms of adjacent dancers in the shape of a "W", right hand palm up, left hand palm down
 "Teacup hold", in which each dancer places his left hand on his stomach making a "handle" with his left arm, and loops his right hand loosely through the arm of the right-hand dancer
 Shoulder hold, with the arms held out straight horizontally to the sides, the hands resting on the near shoulders of the adjacent dancers. This was originally a men's hold, used only in the men's line.
 Belt hold (na lesa), with each dancer holding the front of the belt or sash of the two adjacent dancers, left arm over right

Bulgarian dances are distinctive for their subtle rhythms and intricate footwork. In some dances, the dancers repeat the same pattern of steps throughout the dance, while others are "called" dances with several different steps in which the leader calls out changes in the steps at his discretion. Still, others have a basic step which individual dancers may embellish at specific points with variations like stamps and foot slaps.

In dances in which the line moves to the right or left, the dancer at the head of the line is the "leader". It is his responsibility to lead the line so it doesn't collide with other lines, and in "called" dances to call the variations. New dancers joining a dancing line join at the end; it is bad manners to join at the head of the line, in front of the leader.

Regional differences

Bulgaria is divided into seven ethnographic regions: Northern Bulgaria, Dobruja, Shopluk, Thrace, Strandzha, Macedonia and Rhodopes. Each region has its own distinctive style of dance, to the extent that a knowledgeable observer can often tell which region a group of Bulgarians comes from by how they perform a popular dance like the pravo. In addition, due to the intricate ethnic mix in the Balkans, each locality and even each village may have its own variation of a dance, different enough that it amounts to a distinct dance. In Bulgarian folkdance literature, local variations are often differentiated by adding the geographical origin to the dance name: for example pravo plovdivsko horo means "the pravo dance from the town of Plovdiv".

Rhythm and meter
The proportions of the beats do not follow any exact rational proportions. For example, the well-known tune "Eleno Mome" (Елено Моме) exists written in three forms: (1) , (2) , and (3)  times. Here, the latter two forms exist both as a musicologist's way to attempt to indicate the tendency of speeding up the last and first beats, as well in formal version, where the musician plays 3 or 4 about equal length notes on the beat. In music band playing, the meter  seems favored, thus skipping some of the time-bending subtleties. Given this fact, though, some meters are more common or popular, but there is a wide variation of less frequent combinations, as well.

In the list below, the denominator follows in part notational practice of the region, and in part the speed of the type of tune, giving the  note a reasonable number of beats per minute (as on a metronome).

Folk dancers often speak in terms of "quick" and "slow" instead of a steady meter "1, 2, 3," etc. These dance rhythms may not agree with the rhythms and meters performed by the musicians. The dancers thus dance to a meter composition , which may also be played by the musicians, e.g., in Traichovo horo (Трайчово хоро).

Therefore, in dance instruction, quick and slow beat descriptions, in combination with intuition and careful listening, may be a good approach, though not suitable for performing and notating the music. In addition, a dance instructor not familiar with the exact musical rhythms should not demonstrate these dance rhythms without music. It would be best to use a slowed-down playback, lest the dancers become confused at full speed.

List of Bulgarian folk dances 

Below is a list of some Bulgarian folk dances, along with their commonly written rhythms and time signatures. The word horo means "dance" and is sometimes added to the name of the dance.

Since the transliteration of Bulgarian is problematic, the official Bulgarian transliteration is used, which can be checked at Transliteration of proper names in Bulgaria, followed within parenthesizes by the Bulgarian name and, after a semicolon, (for searchability) alternative transliterations. Following a Bulgarian sheet music practice, more complex meters generally appear later in the list.
 Trite pati (Трите пъти; Trite puti, Trite pŭti) in : Line dance with rapid feet movement; step rhythm quick-quick-slow = .
 Tropanka (Тропанка) in : Stampy Dobrudzha men's dance, V handhold, with swinging and pumping arm motions.
 Opas (Опас) in : A varied dance often done with hands across the chest of the person next to you with the next in line.
In Bulgaria, the  portion is also transcribed in  using triplets.Pravo is characterised by left-over-right arms "belt-hold" (in lieu of hand hold), a beginning right foot diving step toward the center of from one to many concentric broken circles, traveling ultimately counterclockwise.
 Shopsko horo (Шопско хоро; Shopluk horo, Shop dance) in : Men's dance often accompanied with bagpipes (gaida) and drum (tŭpan).
In the southern parts of Bulgaria, North Macedonia and Greece, the quick-slow pattern is sometimes reversed into a slow-quick pattern.
 Lesnoto (Лесното хоро) in : A slow line dance with steps resembling the pravo horo.
 Ginka (Гинка) in : A slow line dance from the Pirin Mountains.
 Svornato horo (Сворнато хоро) in : From the Pirin Mountains, a four-phrase line dance.
 Varnensko horo (Варненско хоро) in : A line dance with slow graceful steps.
 Krivo plovdivsko horo (Криво пловдивско хоро) in : listen.
 Buchimish (Бучимиш; Bučimiš) in : A line dance.
 Yove male mome (Йове мале моме; Jove male mome, Jove malaj mome), Povela e Yova (Повела е Йова) in 
 Sandansko horo (Санданско хоро) in 
Suitable for a performance with 6 to 10 dancers on a stage or an exhibition area.
 Dunavsko horo (Дунавско хоро)

Details on Bulgarian dances 

Thus, even though these are well-known rhythmic patterns, one may not arrive at an unambiguous meter interpretation, the way listeners of Western music are used to.

Many of the dances are formed by each person holding the belt or sash of the dancer on either side. These belts are typically fit loosely around the waist so that each person can move easily within the belt, while the overall line can stay together. Although there are basic steps that make up the dance, certain people may improvise variations, sometimes forming a competition between the dancers. These variations must result in the same movement as the rest of the line, but may consist of additional or slightly different steps.

For example, the basic pajdushko horo dance consists of a series of four hop-steps (actually, lift-steps) to the right, followed by a series of four steps to the left where the right foot crosses in front of the left foot on the quick beat, then weight is transferred onto the right foot, which pushes the dancer to the left on the slow beat. Finally, the line moves backwards using four hop-steps, and the dance is repeated. Variations might consist of alternating the right foot in front of and behind the left foot, forming a basic grapevine dance step. Another variation might be that instead of hop-steps backwards, a dancer might use a series of scissor steps and end with a pas-de-bas step.

See also
 List of folk dances sorted by origin
 Bistritsa Babi
 International folk dance

References

 Манол Тодоров, Българска народна музика (Bulgarian National Music), Музика, София (1976).

External links

 Bulgarian folk workshop 
 Information on Balkan dances, including Bulgarian horo.
 Bulgarian folk dances
 Video clips of Bulgarian dances from instructors
 For learning Bulgarian dances and instruments in the United States
 Videos of Bulgarian folk dances 

 
Folk dances